Riordan Roett (born September 10, 1938) is an American political scientist specializing in Latin America. He received his B.A. and Ph.D. from Columbia University in political science and was a post-doctoral fellow at the Massachusetts Institute of Technology. He was assistant professor (1967–1973) and acting director of the Center for Latin American Studies at Vanderbilt University and was the Sarita and Don Johnston Professor of Political Science and Director of the Western Hemisphere Program at the Johns Hopkins University's Paul H. Nitze School of Advanced International Studies (SAIS) in Washington, D.C. until 2018. He is now Professor and Director Emeritus of Latin American Studies Program at Johns Hopkins SAIS.

Roett is a member of the Council on Foreign Relations in New York and a former national president of the Latin American Studies Association. In 2001,  President Fernando Henrique Cardoso of Brazil named Roett to the Order of Rio Branco with the rank of Commander. Fluent in Portuguese and Spanish, he is a specialist on Brazilian, Mercosur, and Mexican issues and the author of several books on Latin America's political economy.

Member of the board of directors for a number of closed-end mutual funds at Legg Mason Global Asset Management; member of the Council on Foreign Relations and The Bretton Woods Committee; recipient of the Order of Rio Branco from the government of Brazil with the rank of commander; recipient of the Order of Bernardo O'Higgins from the government of Chile with the rank of gran oficial; recognized for contributions to Johns Hopkins SAIS with establishment of the Riordan Roett Chair in Latin American Studies in 2004; former consultant to Chase Manhattan Bank in various capacities; was a faculty fellow of the World Economic Forum at the annual meeting in Davos, Switzerland; served as national president of the Latin American Studies Association; PhD, political science, Columbia University

Since 2011, he acts as Advisor on the US and Latin America especially for politics to Fair Observer, an online magazine covering global issues from a plurality of perspectives.

Selected published works
 The Andes in Focus: Security, Democracy and Economic Reform, co-author, co-editor (2005)
 Mexico in the Age of Globalization: Changing Domestic and External Dynamics, co-author, co-editor (2004)
 Latin America in a Changing Global Environment, co-author, co-editor (2003)
 Post-Stabilization Politics in Latin America: Competition, Transition, Collapse, co-author, co-editor (2003)
 Exchange Rate Politics in Latin America, co-author, co-editor (2000)
 Brazil: Politics in a Patrimonial Society (1999, fifth edition)
 Mercosur: Regional Integration, World Markets (1999)
 Mexico’s Private Sector: Recent History, Future Challenges (1998)
 Brazil Under Cardoso (1997)
 The Mexican Peso Crisis: International Perspectives (1996)
 The Challenge of Institutional Reform in Mexico (1995)
 Political and Economic Liberalization in Mexico: At a Critical Juncture? (1993)
 Mexico’s External Relations in the 1990s (1991)
 Paraguay: The Personalist Legacy, co-author (1991)
 Mexico and the United States: Managing the Relationship
 Latin America, Western Europe and the U.S.: Reevaluating the Atlantic Triangle, co-author (1985)

References

1938 births
Living people
American political scientists
Latin Americanists
Johns Hopkins University faculty
Massachusetts Institute of Technology alumni
Brazilianists
Columbia College (New York) alumni